Yoshimichi is a masculine Japanese given name.

Possible writings
Yoshimichi can be written using different combinations of kanji characters. Here are some examples:

義道, "justice, way"
義路, "justice, route"
義通, "justice, pass through"
佳道, "skilled, way"
佳路, "skilled, route"
佳通, "skilled, pass through"
善道, "virtuous, way"
善路, "virtuous, route"
善通, "virtuous, pass through"
吉道, "good luck, way"
吉路, "good luck, route"
吉通, "good luck, pass through"
良道, "good, way"
良路, "good, route"
良通, "good, pass through"
恭道, "respectful, way"
嘉道, "excellent, way"
嘉路, "excellent, route"
能道, "capacity, way"
喜道, "rejoice, way"

The name can also be written in hiragana よしみち or katakana ヨシミチ.

Notable people with the name
Yoshimichi Hasegawa (長谷川 好道, 1850–1924), Japanese general
Yoshimichi Hara (原 嘉道, 1867–1944), Japanese politician
Yoshimichi Inaba (稲葉 良通, 1515–1589), Japanese samurai
Yoshimichi Isshiki (一色 義道, ????–1579), Japanese daimyō
Yoshimichi Onodera (小野寺 義道, 1566–1645), Japanese daimyō
Yoshimichi Tokugawa (徳川 吉通, 1689–1713), Japanese daimyō

Japanese masculine given names